Rubery Hill Hospital was a mental health facility in Birmingham, England. The Chapel, which still survives, is a Grade II listed building.

History
The hospital, which was designed by William Martin and John Henry Chamberlain using a Standard Pavilion layout, opened as the Second Birmingham City Asylum in January 1882. Additional ward pavilions were completed in 1897. It became the 1st Birmingham War Hospital during the First World War and then became Rubery Hill Mental Hospital in 1919. During the Second World War it remained a civilian establishment. It joined the National Health Service as Rubery Hill Hospital in 1948.

After the introduction of Care in the Community in the early 1980s, the hospital went into a period of decline and closed in 1993. Most of the buildings were subsequently demolished.

References

Defunct hospitals in England
Hospitals in Birmingham, West Midlands
Hospital buildings completed in 1882
Hospitals established in 1882
1882 establishments in England
Former psychiatric hospitals in England
Hospitals disestablished in 1993
1993 disestablishments in England